Human Universe is a 2014 book by the theoretical physicists Brian Cox and Andrew Cohen. The book aims to explore Human life as well as understand what it is, and is explained in a way that is accessible to a general reader. The book is based on a series with the same name Human Universe.

References 

Popular science books
2014 non-fiction books
Collaborative non-fiction books
William Collins, Sons books